Steam Powered Aereo-Takes is a collection of outtakes, demos and jam-sessions from John Hartford's groundbreaking 1971 album Aereo-Plain, released in 2002. The music is a blend of traditional bluegrass musicianship, and the hippie spirit of the '70s. The other members of the Aereo-Plain Band were Norman Blake, Vassar Clements, Tut Taylor, and Randy Scruggs.

History
Hartford and the members of the Aereo-Plain Band recorded Aereo-Plain, a blend of traditional bluegrass musicianship, and the hippie spirit of the '70s. The album has been called the forerunner of the genre now known as "Newgrass". The recording was done in informal jam sessions that created some 80-plus reels of tape. The tracks featured here are song sketches, outtakes, demos, impromptu jams, and goofing-off. Music critic Zac Johnson wrote that "If the sessions that were used on Aereo-Plain became the Revolver of the progressive bluegrass movement, this disc is more like the White Album or maybe Let It Be."

Reception

Writing for Allmusic, critic Zac Johnson wrote "The song ideas are there, but they feel looser and more free, with each of the performers playing with ideas and song structures, fiddling with things when they don't work, and milking them when they click." Rick Bell of Country Standard Time wrote "Its historical value can't be denied, yet much of it sounds as fresh and innovative today as it must have 30 years ago. Aereoplane offered up several dandy instrumentals and traditional numbers during their short time together... arguably the best among a career of sometimes offbeat, but never dull music."

Track listing
All tracks composed by John Hartford; except where indicated

"Where the Old Red River Flows"  (Jimmie Davis) – 3:07
"Ruff and Ready"  (Tut Taylor) – 1:51
"Blame It on Joann" – 3:12
"The Vamp from Back in the Goodle Days"  – 4:41
"Emanuel Cant" – 1:44
"Bad Music (Is Better Than No Music at All)"  (Tut Taylor) – 4:32
"Dig a Hole"  (Traditional) – 4:14
"Presbyterian Guitar" – 2:03
"Strange Old Man" – 1:40
"Lady Jane" – 2:43
"Oasis"  (Tut Taylor) – 3:31
"Because of You" – 1:10
"Morning Bugle" – 3:28
"John Henry"  (Traditional) – 1:44
"Doin' My Time"  (Jimmie Skinner) – 3:06
"Keep on Truckin'" – 2:46
"Don't Ever Take Your Eyes Off the Game, Babe" – 3:28
"Howard Hughes Blues" – 3:01

Personnel
John Hartford - banjo, guitar, violin, vocals
Norman Blake - guitar, mandolin, vocals
Vassar Clements - violin, cello, viola, vocals
Tut Taylor - dobro, vocals
Randy Scruggs - bass, vocals

Production
Producer: David Bromberg
Recording Engineer: Warren Dewey/Claude Hill
Mixing: Toby Mountain
Art Direction: Susan Marsh
Photography: Peter Amft
Liner notes: Bob Carlin

References

1971 albums
John Hartford albums
Rounder Records albums
Warner Records albums
Demo albums